Exile on Main St. is an album by American noise rock band Pussy Galore, released in December 1986 by Shove Records. The album itself is a cover album. The entire project was an attempt at re-interpreting The Rolling Stones' 1972 album Exile on Main St. in its entirety. Its only official release format was the cassette tape, in a limited run of only 550 hand-numbered copies.

Background 
While Pussy Galore's version is an intentionally deconstructionist approach to remaking the original album, most of the songs on the album remain recognizable and reconcilable to their original versions. One notable exception is Pussy Galore's performance of "Shine A Light", which, while itself an actual recording of that song, was purposefully distorted essentially beyond recognition. On a bootleg which circulates among fans, titled "Exile On Main Street (Unmixed Version)" or simply "Exile Unmixed", many performances that were purposefully obscured on the official release are clearly audible and it seems that the group did make somewhat of a sincere attempt to learn all eighteen songs from the original LP.

In addition to the general chaos, purposeful distortion, and incomprehensible mixing and editing, the record also contains bits of dialog from the band members arguing and yelling at one another, as well as some original Rolling Stones versions of tracks from "Exile..." bleeding through the mix at points. One notable appearance comes from what appears to be a copy of The Velvet Underground's song "Heroin", though it sounds as if it is skipping on a damaged vinyl record.

Reception 

NME ranked the album number 253 in "The 500 Greatest Albums of All Time" in October 2013. David Browne called the album "the symbolic passing of the irreverent torch."

Track listing

Personnel
Adapted from the Exile on Main St liner notes.

Pussy Galore
 Bob Bert – drums, percussion, vocals
 Julie Cafritz – electric guitar, vocals
 Neil Hagerty – electric guitar, violin, percussion, vocals, mixing
 Cristina Martinez – electric guitar, vocals
 Jon Spencer – lead vocals, electric guitar, percussion, mixing

Production
 Rick Hall – mixing, cover art
 Pussy Galore – production

Release history

References

External links 
 

1986 albums
Pussy Galore (band) albums
Covers albums
The Rolling Stones tribute albums